Anton Aleksandrovich Tabala (Belarusian: Антон Аляксандравіч Табала, Russian: Антон Александрович Табала; born December 23, 1989), better known as HOMIE, is a Belarusian singer, songwriter, rap and hip hop artist.

Biography 
Anton was born on December 26, 1989, in the Belarusian city of Minsk.

In his childhood, he had several hobbies: Music, football and hockey.

Sport brought the future performer to the Belarusian University of Physical Education.

Tabala played for the Minsk clubs "Dynamo-Keramin", "Youth", "Metallurg (Zhlobin)". Perhaps he would have remained in the sport if not for the injury. There is a second version that he quit studying because he did not see further prospects.

Anton left professional sports and switched to musical activity, which was interesting to him from school.

Discography 

 2014 —  (It's crazy to be the first) 
 2017 —  (There is no you in the city) 
 2019 —  (ep) (Adieu)

Book editions 

 Красовский, Валерий (2022-05-15). Очерки с горизонта событий (in Russian). Litres. . 
 Кравченко, Юлия (2022-05-15). Прикоснуться к смерти (in Russian). Litres. .

References 

Belarusian rappers
21st-century Belarusian male singers
Hip hop singers
1989 births
Living people